This is a list of buildings and structures in Hayward, California. The list includes structures once located in Hayward, California no longer standing there, and buildings historically associated with the city that are not currently within city limits. Structures in the National Register of Historic Places are indicated with NRHP. Structures (and sites of former structures) that are California Historical Landmarks, are indicated with CHL.

Hayward's first city hall, located in Alex Giualini Plaza
Centennial Hall Convention Center, now demolished
Eden Congregational Church (NRHP)
Green Shutter Hotel (NRHP)
The Hayward Ace Hardware, owned by news reporter Jim Wieder, an historic building built in 1900 as the Hayward Emporium mercantile store, where upstairs, boxers Max Baer and George Foreman later trained.
Hayward Amtrak station
Hayward BART station
Hayward City Hall
Hayward Executive Airport
Hayward Hall of Justice
Hayward High School
Hayward Shoreline Interpretive Center
Harry Rowell Rodeo Ranch, now within the bounds of Castro Valley, drew rodeo cowboys from across the continent, and western movie actors such as Slim Pickens and others from Hollywood.
Hunt's cannery, operated through most of the 20th century, closed and demolished in late 20th century
Kaiser Permanente Medical Center, building no longer extant as of 2014
Meek Mansion (NRHP), in unincorporated Alameda County, historically associated with Hayward
Mervyns Building, former headquarters of the Mervyns department store chain (demolished in 21st century)
Moreau Catholic High School
Mount Eden High School
Pioneer Amphitheatre
Pioneer Gym
Pioneer Stadium
Russell City Energy Center
San Mateo–Hayward Bridge, with the eastern terminus in Hayward
Skywest Commons, shopping center
South Hayward BART station
Southland Mall
St. Rose Hospital
Sunset High School
Tennyson High School
Ukraina Ranch, the former property of Agapius Honcharenko (no longer extant) CHL#1025, marker located in Garin Regional Park
City Center Building, the second former city hall, briefly the tallest building in Hayward (abandoned in 1989, then demolished in 2020)
Warren Hall, on the California State University, East Bay campus, demolished in 2013

References

See also
National Register of Historic Places listings in Alameda County, California

 
Hayward
Hayward